The Railways Act 2005 (c 14) is an Act of the Parliament of the United Kingdom concerning the regulatory structure for railways in the United Kingdom.

Overview 

The bill was introduced and published on 25 November 2004 and received royal assent on 7 April 2005.  The act implemented the institutional changes published in the Department for Transport's white paper on rail of 15 July 2004, principally:

 Abolished the Strategic Rail Authority (SRA), transferring some of its functions to the Secretary of State, some (consumer protection ones) to the Office of Rail Regulation, and some to the devolved administrations.
 Reduced the financial jurisdiction of the Office of Rail Regulation, imposing a Treasury-determined cap on its financial powers and requiring the Secretary of State for Transport to specify what he wants in return for the public subsidy which goes into the railway industry.
 Established Passenger Focus as a single national consumer representation body, replacing the geographically separated Rail Passengers Council.
 Set up a new regime for the closure of railway facilities and services.

Government defeat

During the final parliamentary stages of the passage of the Railways Act 2005, the government sustained a defeat in the House of Lords over an amendment which would have protected passenger and train operators against a diminution of infrastructure quality or performance – or being held rigidly to their contracts for the provision of railway services which assumed no such diminution - if the Secretary of State for Transport restricted funds available to Network Rail.  However, the amendment was reversed the same day in the House of Commons with a much weaker provision substituted for it.  The House of Lords did not insist on their original amendment, and the legislation was passed without the protections which the train operators needed. Critics regarded this as an unjustified interference in an inter-dependent contractual matrix, contrary to the legitimate expectations of private investors in the railway.

Section 60 - Short title, commencement and extent
The following orders have been made under this section:
The Railways Act 2005 (Commencement No. 1) Order 2005 (S.I. 2005/1444 (C. 64))
The Railways Act 2005 (Commencement No. 2) Order 2005 (S.I. 2005/1909 (C. 82))
The Railways Act 2005 (Commencement No. 3) Order 2005 (S.I. 2005/2252 (C. 94))
The Railways Act 2005 (Commencement No. 4) Order 2005 (S.I. 2005/2812 (C. 117))
The Railways Act 2005 (Commencement No. 5) Order 2006 (S.I. 2006/266 (C. 7))
The Railways Act 2005 (Commencement No. 6) Order 2006 (S.I. 2006/1951 (C. 65))
The Railways Act 2005 (Commencement No. 7, Transitional and Saving Provisions) Order 2006 (S.I. 2006/2911 (C. 102))
The Railways Act 2005 (Commencement No. 8) Order 2007 (S.I. 2007/62 (C. 2))
The Railways Act 2005 (Commencement No. 9) Order 2007 (S.I. 2007/1993 (C. 74))

References
Halsbury's Statutes,

External links
The Railways Act 2005, as amended from the National Archives.
The Railways Act 2005, as originally enacted from the National Archives.
Explanatory notes to the Railways Act 2005.
 Summary of key points

Railway Acts
United Kingdom Acts of Parliament 2005
2005 in rail transport
Transport policy in the United Kingdom